The Grandview Trail is a hiking trail located on the South Rim of the Grand Canyon National Park, located in the U.S. state of Arizona.It was built in 1893 by miners and is noted for its cobblestone and cribbing sections.

Description

From the trail head, it makes a quick descent through the Kaibab Limestone and Toroweap Formation, making a couple of early switchbacks. Portions of this section of trail were reconstructed in the summer of 2005 after a couple of storms washed them out.

The trail generally follows the western side of the ridge that extends northeast of Grandview Point which marks a natural break in the Coconino Sandstone.

Camping is allowed on the mesa in designated areas on its eastern side and by permit only. Permits are issued by the Backcountry Information Center.  Signage on trail indicates the locations of the campsites.  Composting toilets have been installed, but no water is available on the mesa.

The trail splits on Horseshoe Mesa near the Last Chance Mine. A spur trail leads east down a break in the Redwall Limestone on the eastern side of the mesa close to the rim. The spur trail is steep, leading past Miners Spring which is the nearest water source for camping on Horseshoe Mesa.

To the west of Last Chance Mine, a western spur from the Grandview Trail cuts through a break in the Redwall Limestone and descends the western side of the mesa following Cottonwood Creek. Water taken from this source must be filtered, treated, or boiled before consuming.

The Grandview Trail follows the west side of a small butte that caps the mesa. It leads to the northern end of the mesa, and then descends between the two arms of the mesa to a junction with the Tonto Trail. From this point, the east branch doubles back toward Hance Canyon, and the west branch leads to Cottonwood Creek.

See also
 The Grand Canyon
 List of trails in Grand Canyon National Park
 Horseshoe Mesa

References

External links

 Grand Canyon National Park, Official site
 Grandview Trail National Park Service factsheet.

Hiking trails in Grand Canyon National Park